Aleksander Tulp (5 March 1883 Tallinn - April 1952 Volhov District, Leningrad Oblast, Russia) was an Estonian politician. He was a member of Estonian Constituent Assembly.

References

1883 births
1952 deaths
Politicians from Tallinn
People from Kreis Harrien
Estonian Social Democratic Workers' Party politicians
Members of the Estonian Constituent Assembly
Members of the Riigikogu, 1920–1923